Thomas Lee (born ) is an English former professional rugby league footballer who last played as a  for Halifax RLFC in the Betfred Championship. Lee has played for eight different clubs during his career.

Lee has previously played for St Helens (Heritage № 1235), Salford Red Devils, London Broncos (Heritage № 532), Huddersfield Giants, Wakefield Trinity Wildcats (Heritage № 1287), Crusaders RL and Hull F.C.

Background
Lee was born in Kingston upon Hull, Humberside, England.

Early career

Senior career

Hull F.C. (2005-09)
Lee made his professional rugby league début in 2005. Over five-years, Lee made 78 first-grade appearances for Hull F.C.

Crusaders RL (2010)
Lee spent only one season in 2010 at Brewery Field, with the Crusaders RL.

Wakefield Trinity Wildcats (2011)
Once again, Lee only spent one season with the Wakefield Trinity Wildcats in the 2011 Super League season. He went onto record 27 appearances and scored seven tries.

Huddersfield Giants (2012)
Lee played for the Huddersfield Giants in the 2012 rugby league season. Lee only represented the West Yorkshire outfit for one season, before moving to the London Broncos.

London Broncos (2013)
Lee played one season in the south of England with the London Broncos in the 2013 campaign.

Salford Red Devils (2014-16)
Lee played for the Salford Red Devils in the 2014, 2015 and 2016 seasons. Lee made 51 appearances, scoring four tries and kicking two goals, for the team from the AJ Bell Stadium.

St. Helens (2017)
The start of the 2017 season marked the fifth time that Lee had represented a club for only a solitary camping. As he played for St. Helens making 19 appearances, before moving back to the city of Kingston upon Hull to play under Head Coach Tim Sheens, for newly-promoted Hull Kingston Rovers.

Hull Kingston Rovers (2018 - 2019)
On 24 October 2017, it was revealed that Lee had signed a two-year contract to play for Hull Kingston Rovers in the 2018 and 2019 Super League seasons.
Lee scored his first try for Hull Kingston Rovers at the 2018 Magic Weekend against Hull F.C. On 2019, Lee announced his retirement

Halifax
On 5 March 2020 it was announced that he had come out of retirement to join Halifax to fill the void created by the sudden loss of Keal Carlile, who was forced to retire due to a heart condition
In January 2021, the club web site reported that Lee had been released and would not feature in the 2021 season

Rugby Union
On 27 February 2020 it was announced that Lee had signed up to Hull RUFC

References

External links
Hull FC profile
SL profile
(archived by web.archive.org) Wildcats Take On Tommy Lee
Profile at saints.org.uk

1988 births
Living people
Crusaders Rugby League players
English rugby league players
Halifax R.L.F.C. players
Huddersfield Giants players
Hull F.C. players
Hull Kingston Rovers players
London Broncos players
Rugby articles needing expert attention
Rugby league hookers
Rugby league locks
Rugby league players from Kingston upon Hull
Salford Red Devils captains
Salford Red Devils players
St Helens R.F.C. players
Wakefield Trinity players